This a list of notable actors born in Jamaica.

List
Cherine Anderson (b. 1984, East Kingston, Jamaica), actress and dancehall/reggae vocalist
Esther Anderson (b. 1946, Saint Mary Parish), filmmaker, photographer and actress
Roxanne Beckford (b. 1969, Kingston, Jamaica), film and television actress
Paul Campbell (b. Jamaica), film and stage actor
Sabrina Colie (b. 1980, Mandeville, Jamaica), actress and director
Doña Croll (b. 1959, Jamaica), television actress
 Dhalia Harris (b. Spanish Town), actress, television personality
Charles Hyatt (b. 1931, Kingston, Jamaica; d. 2007), film and television actor
Clifton Jones (b. 1943, Jamaica), television actor
Elroy Josephs (b. 1939, Jamaica; d. 1997), actor and dancer who was the first black dance teacher at a British University
Venice Kong (b. 1961, St. Mary, Jamaica), model and actress
Ky-Mani Marley (b. 1976, Falmouth, Jamaica), actor and reggae musician
Louis Marriott (b. 1935, St. Andrew, Jamaica), actor, director, writer and broadcaster
Yanna McIntosh (b. Jamaica), film, television and stage actress
Count Prince Miller (b. 1935, Saint Mary Parish, Jamaica), actor and musician
Evan Parke (b. 1968, Kingston, Jamaica), film and television actor 
Keith 'Shebada' Ramsey (b. Kingston, Jamaica), actor and comedian
Audrey Reid (b. 1970, East Kingston, Jamaica), film actress
David Reivers (b. 1958, Kingston, Jamaica), film and television actor
Oliver Samuels (b. 1948, St. Mary, Jamaica), comedian and television actor
Dennis Scott (b. 1939, Kingston, Jamaica; d. 1991), playwright, actor, dancer and poet
Madge Sinclair (b. 1938, Kingston, Jamaica; d. 1995), film and television actress
Roy Stewart (b. 1925, Jamaica; d. 2008), actor who ran Caribbean restaurant The Globe in Notting Hill
Peter Straker (b. 1943, Jamaica), actor and singer
Peter Williams (b. 1957, Kingston), film and television actor

See also
List of Jamaicans

Actors
Jamaican actors
Jamaican